The Spice of Life Too is an album by jazz fusion guitarist Kazumi Watanabe; featuring Bill Bruford, Jeff Berlin and Peter Vettese. It was released on the Gramavision record label in 1988. The original title released in Japan is "The Spice of Life 2" with a different cover.

Reception
Allmusic awarded the album with 4.5 stars and its review by Paul Kohler states: "A continuation of Spice of Life with stronger compositions and a hint of softer tones, it's very nice!"

Track listing
 "Andre" (Kazumi Watanabe) – 5:10
 "We the Planet" (Watanabe) – 5:20
 "Fu Bu Ki " (Watanabe, Bill Bruford, Jeff Berlin) – 5:10
 "Rain" (Watanabe) – 4:57
 "Small Wonder" (Bruford) – 5:05
 "Concrete Cow" (Watanabe, Berlin) – 5:22
 "Kaimon" (Watanabe) – 5:35
 "Men and Angels" ( Bruford) – 5:35

Personnel
Kazumi Watanabe – guitars
Bill Bruford – Simmons SDX electronic drums
Jeff Berlin – bass
Peter Vettese – keyboards

References

1988 albums
Kazumi Watanabe albums
Gramavision Records albums